FTC Fiľakovo is a Slovak football team, based in the town of Fiľakovo. The club was founded in 1908.

Historical names 

 1908 – Füleki Haladás ATC (Füleki Haladás Atlétikai Torna Club)
 1912 – Füleki AC (Füleki Atlétikai Club)
 1914 – Füleki FC (Füleki Football Club)
 1920 – Füleki TC (Füleki Torna Club)
 1940 – Füleki VKSE (Füleki Vasutas Kultúr Sport Egyesület)
 1943 – Füleki Vasutas SC (Füleki Vasutas Sport Club)
 1945 – ŠK Závody Fiľakovo (Športový klub Závody Fiľakovo)
 1949 – TJ Sokol Kovosmalt Fiľakovo (Telovýchovná jednota Sokol Kovosmalt Fiľakovo)
 1950 – ZŠJ Fiľakovo (Základná športová jednota Fiľakovo)
 1951 – DŠO Kovosmalt Fiľakovo (Dobrovolná športová organizacía Kovosmalt Fiľakovo)
 1953 – TJ Spartak Fiľakovo (Telovýchovná jednota Spartak Fiľakovo)
 1960 – TJ Kovomier Fiľakovo (Telovýchovná jednota Kovomier Fiľakovo)
 1992 – TJ FTC Fiľakovo (Telovýchovná jednota FTC Fiľakovo)
 1993 – FTC Fiľakovo

References

External links 
 at futbalovekluby.sk 

Football clubs in Slovakia
Association football clubs established in 1908
1908 establishments in Slovakia
1908 establishments in Hungary